Aryeh Gamliel (11 March 1951 – 6 August 2021) was an Israeli rabbi and politician who served as a member of the Knesset for Shas between 1988 and 2003.

Biography
Born in Beersheba, Gamliel was educated at a religious high school and a Talmudic College, before working as head of a Talmudic College.

He was first elected to the Knesset on Shas' list in 1988. After being re-elected in 1992, he was appointed Deputy Minister of Housing and Construction in Yitzhak Rabin's government, but resigned on 9 September 1993.

After retaining his seat again in the 1996 elections, he was appointed Deputy Minister of Religious Affairs, a position which he served in (aside from two brief breaks in August 1997 and January/February 1998) until the 1999 elections. He retained his seat again in the elections (in which he was placed second on the list after Aryeh Deri), but lost it in the 2003 elections. A relative of his, Gila Gamliel, later served as a Knesset member for Likud.

He died on 6 August 2021.

References

External links
 

1951 births
2021 deaths
Israeli Orthodox Jews
Israeli educators
Politicians from Beersheba
Israeli Rosh yeshivas
Shas politicians
Members of the 12th Knesset (1988–1992)
Members of the 13th Knesset (1992–1996)
Members of the 14th Knesset (1996–1999)
Members of the 15th Knesset (1999–2003)
Deputy ministers of Israel